Sowmaeh Zarrin (also Romanized as Şowma‘eh Zarrīn; also known as Şowma‘eh, Sowme‘eh, Suma, and Summa) is a village in Alan Baraghush Rural District, Mehraban District, Sarab County, East Azerbaijan Province, Iran. At the 2006 census, its population was 444, in 112 families.

References 

Populated places in Sarab County